Clifford A. Hart Jr. is an American former diplomat. He assumed his responsibilities as Consul General of the United States of America to Hong Kong and Macau beginning on July 30, 2013. As Consul General, he is responsible for the Hong Kong and Macau Special Administrative Regions. His most recent appointment was as the Special Envoy for the Six-Party Talks, for which President Obama accorded him the personal rank of Ambassador.

Over his 30-year diplomatic career, Hart's overseas experience includes three assignments to China and one each in the Soviet Union and Iraq. He also has pursued Chinese language training in Taiwan. He can understand Cantonese.  As Consul General to Hong Kong and Macau, he made good use of social media and is well-liked locally; he is affectionately nicknamed "Clifford BB".

Hart's other Washington assignments include, at the White House, the National Security Council's China/Taiwan Director; at the Pentagon, Foreign Policy Advisor to the Chief of Naval Operations; and, at the State Department, Director of the Office of Taiwan Coordination, Deputy Coordinator for Reconstruction and Stabilization, Operations Center Deputy Director for Crisis Management, and other positions.

Hart is a recipient of the State Department's highest commendation for diplomatic reporting and the U.S. Navy's Distinguished Public Servant Award. He also has received State Department Superior and Meritorious Honor Awards and the U.S. Army's Meritorious Civilian Service Award.

Hart holds a master's degree from the University of Virginia, where he was a President's Fellow.

On June 10, 2016, the Department of State announced that Hart would be succeeded by Kurt Tong, Principal Deputy Assistant Secretary of the Department of State, from August 2016. During a Facebook Live chat session in July 2016, Hart said that he will retire from his 33-year diplomatic career and return to Hong Kong to work for a private institution.

References 

|-

University of Virginia alumni
United States Special Envoys
United States Department of State officials
1961 births
Living people
20th-century American diplomats
21st-century American diplomats
Consuls general of the United States in Hong Kong and Macau
University of Mary Washington alumni